Holmul may refer to:

 Holmul, Guatemala, archaeological site of the Maya civilization
 Holmul River (Guatemala), a river in northeastern Guatemala, upper tributary of the Rio Bravo
 Holmul River (Romania), a river in Romania, tributary of the  Tazlăul Sărat